Shaa FM is a Sinhala radio channel station in Sri Lanka owned by ABC Radio Networks. It covers the whole island. This radio channel is the first-ever radio channel made for Sri Lankan youth society. Shaa Fm was started in 2002, Sri Lanka.

Awards 
Shaa FM was awarded by the prestigious accolade of “Best News Channel” for the year 2010.

See also
Hiru FM
Sooriyan FM
Hiru TV

References

External links 
 Shaa FM official website

Sri Lankan broadcasters
Sinhala-language radio stations in Sri Lanka
Asia Broadcasting Corporation